Carol Bruneau (born 1956) is a Canadian writer.

Biography 
She lives in Halifax, Nova Scotia, where she has taught writing at NSCAD (Nova Scotia College of Art and Design University) and Dalhousie University. She has a master's degree in English literature from Dalhousie University and a master's degree in journalism from the University of Western Ontario, and has worked extensively as a workshop leader and mentor to new and emerging writers.

She has authored six novels and three short story collections. Her first novel Purple for Sky (2000) won the Thomas Head Raddall Award and the fiction category of the Dartmouth Book Awards in 2001. The book was also shortlisted that year for the Pearson Readers' Choice Award. Her most recent short fiction collection A Bird on Every Tree was shortlisted for the 2018 Raddall Award and Dartmouth Book Award, and her 2018 novel, A Circle on the Surface won the 2019 Jim Connors Dartmouth Book Award for Fiction. Her novel Glass Voices was a Globe and Mail Best Book for 2007. Two of her novels have been published internationally. Her articles, reviews and essays have been published nationwide in newspapers, journals and anthologies. Her latest novel Brighten the Corner Where You Areis inspired by the life and art of Nova Scotian folk artist Maud Lewis.

Bibliography
After the Angel Mill - 1995
Depth Rapture - 1998
Purple for Sky - 2000 (U.S. title: A Purple Thread for Sky)
Why Men Fish Where They Do - 2001
Berth. Cormorant, 2005
Glass Voices. Cormorant, 2007, re-released Nimbus Publishing/Vagrant Press, 2018
These Good Hands. Cormorant, 2015.
A Bird on Every Tree. Nimbus Publishing/Vagrant Press, 2018
A Circle on the Surface. Nimbus/Vagrant, 2018
Brighten the Corner Where You Are: A Novel Inspired by the Life of Maud Lewis. Nimbus/Vagrant, 2020.

References

1956 births
Living people
Canadian women novelists
20th-century Canadian novelists
21st-century Canadian novelists
20th-century Canadian women writers
21st-century Canadian women writers
Academic staff of NSCAD University
Writers from Halifax, Nova Scotia